Tramp, Tramp, Tramp is a 1942 American comedy film directed by Charles Barton and starring Jackie Gleason,  Jack Durant and Florence Rice. The film's sets were designed by the studio's regular art director Lionel Banks. The production was an attempt to replicate the success of rival studio Universal's hit film Buck Privates, starring Abbott and Costello.

Synopsis
Two small town barbers attempt to enlist in the Army following America's entry into World War II. However they are both rejected military unfit. Inspired by a sense of patriotism they form their own "home defense" unit, recruiting other men who have been rejected by the draft board.

Cast
 Jackie Gleason as Hank
 Jack Durant as 	Jed
 Florence Rice as Pam Martin
 Bruce Bennett as Tommy Lydel
 Hallene Hill as Granny
 Billy Curtis as Midget
 Mabel Todd as Vivian
 Forrest Tucker as Blond Bomber
 James Seay as Biggie Waldron
 John Tyrrell as Lefty
 John Harmon as Mousey
 Eddie Foster as Blackie
 Al Hill as Tim
 John Dilson as Judge Smith
 Borrah Minevitch and His Harmonica Rascals as Themselves
 Eddie Kane as Doctor 
 Lloyd Bridges as Guard 
 Heinie Conklin as Soldier
 Herbert Rawlinson as Ex-Soldier Commander 
 William Gould as Colonel

References

Bibliography
 Erickson, Hal . Military Comedy Films: A Critical Survey and Filmography of Hollywood Releases Since 1918. McFarland, 2012.

External links
 

1942 films
1942 comedy films
1940s English-language films
American comedy films
American black-and-white films
Columbia Pictures films
Films directed by Charles Barton
1940s American films